John Shedwick Development Houses  (also known as the Lancastle) is a set of four historic rowhouses located in the Powelton Village neighborhood of Philadelphia, Pennsylvania. They were built in 1875–1876, and are built of brick, with green serpentine limestone facing in the Second Empire-style. They feature wooden first floor porches, projecting bay windows, and mansard roofs with dormers.

It was added to the National Register of Historic Places in 1982.
Many fables exist regarding the characters who lived in the Lancastle.

References

Houses on the National Register of Historic Places in Philadelphia
Second Empire architecture in Pennsylvania
Houses completed in 1876
Powelton Village, Philadelphia